

Brianka is a city in Luhansk Oblast (region) of Ukraine. It is incorporated as a city of oblast significance. Population: , .

It is located between cities of Kadiivka and Alchevsk.

History 
The settlement traces its history to small settlements of Zaporizhian Cossacks, zymivnyki, that appeared in place of future Brianka in 1696.

The place has developed further into a miners' settlement around the local Brianka Quarry since the end of 19th century. After the World War II, in 1944–1962 it was a city raion of neighboring city of Kadiivka.

City since December 1962.

A local newspaper is published in the city since April 1965.

Since 2014, Brianka has been under the effective control of the self-proclaimed Luhansk People's Republic.

During the Russian invasion of Ukraine reports have emerged about Russian soldiers who refused to continue fighting being held captive in the city.

Demographics

Population 
As of 2021, the population is 44,987 people.

Ethnicity 
As of the Ukrainian Census of 2001:
 Ukrainians: 54.9%
 Russians: 42.7%
 Belarusians: 0.8%

Language 
As of the Ukrainian Census of 2001:
Russian: 87.01%
Ukrainian: 12.65%
Belarusian: 0.09%

References 

Cities in Luhansk Oblast
Cities of regional significance in Ukraine
Yekaterinoslav Governorate